Khrustalnyi or Krasnyi Luch  is a city in Rovenky Raion of Luhansk Oblast (province) of south-eastern Ukraine. It is incorporated as a city of oblast significance.

The city came under the control of the pro-Russian Luhansk People's Republic in early 2014. After the September 2022 annexation referendums in Russian-occupied Ukraine, Russia claimed the city as part of Russia.

History
The settlement was founded as Kryndachivka or Krindachevka (Russian: Криндачёвка) in the last years of the 19th century.

It became one of the most important coal mining centres of the Donets Basin.

A local newspaper has been published here since September 1920. In December 1920 the locality was renamed as Krasnyi Luch (lit. "red beam") and designated as a city in 1926.

The city was under German occupation from June 1942 to September 1943. The local Jewish population was killed along with other categories of victims, such as Communists, and were thrown into the shaft of the Bogdan coal mine. The total number of victims was about 2,000.

In January 1965 the city had a population of 101,000 people.

In January 1989 the city population was 113,278 people. It remained an important coal-mining centre. There were several coal-enriching plants, a machine-tool factory, light industries and a railway station.

In January 2013 the city population was 82,765 people.

Since spring 2014, the city has been controlled by Russian-led separatist forces of the Luhansk People's Republic.

On 12 May 2016, the Ukrainian parliament renamed the city from Krasnyi Luch to Khrustalnyi under Ukrainian decommunization laws.

During the 2022 Russian invasion of Ukraine, the city was subject to a Ukrainian Tochka-U ballistic missile strike on 16 June that caused a large Russian ammunition depot belonging to the 2nd Army Corps to detonate. Footage of the attack was uploaded to social media where a group of Luhansk People's Republic militiamen are seen to be sheltering and fleeing from the ensuing ammunition fire.

Demographics 
As of the Ukrainian Census of 2001:

Ethnicity
 Ukrainians: 49.2%
 Russians: 46.1%
 Belarusians: 1.1%

Language
Russian: 87.8%
Ukrainian: 10.4%
Armenian: 0.2%
Belarusian: 0.1%

People associated with Khrustalnyi 
On the right is a picture of the Wall of Honor. Such walls were installed in every oblast seat throughout the Soviet Union. With the dissolution of the Soviet state those landmarks were mostly removed, but in some instances were retained as relics of the past.

Light heavyweight fighter Nikita Krylov originates from Krasnyi Luch.

On August 1, 1943, the well-known WWII fighter pilot Lydia Litvyak took off from a base at Krasnyy Luch, to the last mission from which she never came back.

References

Cities in Luhansk Oblast
Cities of regional significance in Ukraine
Populated places established in the Russian Empire
City name changes in Ukraine
Holocaust locations in Ukraine